Keesaragutta Temple is a Hindu temple dedicated to Shiva and his consort Parvati at Keesaragutta , Keesara Village in Medchal-Malkajgiri district, Telangana, India. It is about 30 km from Hyderabad and 12 km from ECIL. It is located on a small hillock. The temple draws up to lakhs of devotees on the Maha Shivaratri festival and during the Kartika month of the Hindu calendar.

Legend
Legend has it that Rama installed the lingam here to atone for the sin of killing Ravana, who was a brahmin by birth but a demon by nature. He selected this beautiful valley surrounded by hills and verdant greenery for the purpose and ordered Hanuman to bring a lingam from Varanasi, believed to be Shiva's favourite place. Hanuman was late in arriving with the lingam and as the auspicious hour was nearing, Shiva himself, appeared before Rama and presented a lingam to him for installation. Hence the lingam in the temple is called a Swayambhu Linga. It is also called Ramalingeswara as Rama had installed the lingam.

Hanuman returned with 101 lingams for selection from Varanasi and felt aggrieved at not having his lingam installed. Hence he threw them all over the area. Even to this day several lingams are found scattered all over the place outside the temple. These lingams are worshipped along with the lingam in the sanctum of the temple to this day.

To pacify Hanuman, Rama ordained that precedence would be given to him for worship at the temple. He also said that the hillock where the lingam was installed would bear his name Kesarigiri that is, Hanuman, the son of Kesari. Over a period of time, it has colloquially transformed and is now known as Keesara and the hill as Keesaragutta. Ever since, the rituals follow the command of Rama.

Archaeological Excavations

Exploration and Excavations were conducted by the archaeological department in the surroundings of Keesaragutta Temple. Many Remnants of Brick structures and Shiva Lingas were found on the hill north of the temple and a hillock near the water resource. The remnants belonged to Chalukyan Empire reign. Fortification walls, Yagasala and prayer halls were excavated here. Some vestige remnants and rock cut cisterns were found on the hills as an indication that Jainism and Buddhism flourished contemporaneously. On 18 October 2014, twelve idols of Jain Tirthankara dating back to the 4th-5th century were found near the temple steps at a depth of one foot which proves that Jainism co-existed along with Hinduism at Keesaragutta during the time of Vishnukundinas in 4-5th century.

References 

Shiva temples in Telangana
Hindu temples in Telangana